The 1941 Petersfield by-election was held on 22 February 1941.  The by-election was held due to the appointment as Governor of Burma of the incumbent Conservative MP, Reginald Dorman-Smith.  It was won by the unopposed Conservative candidate George Jeffreys.

References

1941 in England
Petersfield
1941 elections in the United Kingdom
By-elections to the Parliament of the United Kingdom in Hampshire constituencies
20th century in Hampshire
Unopposed by-elections to the Parliament of the United Kingdom (need citation)